Chasles' theorem may refer to any of several mathematical results attributed to Michel Chasles (1793–1880):

 Chasles' theorem (kinematics), about translation of rigid bodies
 Chasles' theorem (gravitation), about gravitational attraction of a spherical shell
 Chasles' theorem (geometry), in algebraic geometry about intersections of curves